Recovery was a sloop that was wrecked near Port Stephens, New South Wales, Australia in 1816.

Peter Hibbs was Recoverys owner. In early June 1816 Recovery headed from Hawkesbury to Port Jackson with a cargo of grain when a storm came up that blew Recovery out to sea. On turning the ship around it was wrecked near Port Stephens. The crew of two men, and a woman passenger, struggled ashore and walked 50 miles to Newcastle. On the way some aborigines stripped them of all their clothes.  At Newcastle they were given passage to Sydney on the sloop, Windsor which was also wrecked.

References

Shipwrecks of the Hunter Region
Maritime incidents in 1816
1816 in Australia
1788–1850 ships of Australia
Ships built in Australia
Coastal trading vessels of Australia
Port Stephens Council
Sloops of Australia
Individual sailing vessels